The 1999 Nigerian Senate election in Yobe State was held on February 20, 1999, to elect members of the Nigerian Senate to represent Yobe State. Mamman Bello Ali representing Yobe South and Usman Albishir representing Yobe North won on the platform of Peoples Democratic Party, while Goni Modu Bura representing Yobe East won on the platform of the All Nigeria Peoples Party.

Overview

Summary

Results

Yobe South 
The election was won by Mamman Bello Ali of the Peoples Democratic Party.

Yobe North 
The election was won by Usman Albishir of the Peoples Democratic Party.

Yobe East 
The election was won by Goni Modu Bura of the All Nigeria Peoples Party.

References 

Yob
Yobe State Senate elections
February 1999 events in Nigeria